The following lists events that happened during 2016 in Cape Verde.

Incumbents
President: Jorge Carlos Fonseca
Prime Minister: José Maria Neves (until 22 June), José Ulisses Correia e Silva (from 22 June)

Events
January 20: Tarrafal camp museum in Santiago Island opened by Prime Minister José Maria Neves and the Portuguese Premier António Costa
March 20: the 2016 parliamentary election took place
April 20: Jorge Pedro Mauricio dos Santos president of the National Assembly
April 22: Ulisses Correia e Silva Prime Minister of Cape Verde
June 22: The current Correia e Silva cabinet begins
September: The Prime Minister and members of his government met with the IMF to discuss the 2016 Article IV consultation.
September 4: the 2016 municipal elections took place
October 2: the 2016 presidential elections took place, President Jorge Carlos Fonseca was re-elected

Sports

CS Mindelense won the Cape Verdean Football Championship

Deaths
September 16: António Mascarenhas Monteiro (b. 1944), politician and Prime Minister

References

 
Years of the 21st century in Cape Verde
2010s in Cape Verde
Cape Verde
Cape Verde